Guru Shishyaru is a 1981 Indian Kannada-language comedy film, directed by H. R. Bhargava and produced by Dwarakish under his "Dwarkish Chitra"  production house.

The story followed a fiction with a Guru and his 7 disciples being cursed by the Angels to behave stupid until the angel gets married. The film had an ensemble cast with many characters getting equal footage and importance to all. The lead pair of the movie was Vishnuvardhan and Manjula. The movie is a remake of 1966 Telugu movie Paramanandayya Sishyula Katha which itself was a remake of 1950 Telugu movie Paramanandayya Sishyulu. The movie was dubbed in Tamil as Raja Mohini.

Cast

Soundtrack 
The music of the film was composed by K. V. Mahadevan, with lyrics by Chi. Udaya Shankar. The comedy song "Doddavarella Jaanaralla" was received extremely well.

References

External links 
 

1981 films
1980s historical comedy films
1980s Kannada-language films
Indian historical comedy films
1980s historical adventure films
Indian historical adventure films
Films scored by K. V. Mahadevan
Films directed by H. R. Bhargava
1981 comedy films
Kannada remakes of Telugu films